Reci is a commune in Covasna County, Romania.

Reci or Reçi may also refer to:
 Castra of Reci, a Roman fort in the province of Dacia
 Reci, a tributary of the Râul Negru in Covasna County, Romania
 Reciu, a tributary of the Gârbova in Alba County, Romania
 Fitim Reçi (born 2002), Albanian footballer
 Reçi, Albanian tribe

See also
 Sarmalele Reci, a Romanian rock band